The government of the United Kingdom declared war on the Empire of Japan on 8 December 1941, following the Japanese attacks on British Malaya, Singapore, and Hong Kong on the previous day (same day Malaya and Hong Kong time) as well as in response to the bombing of the US fleet at Pearl Harbor.

Background 

The United Kingdom declared war on Nazi Germany on September 3, 1939 two days after the outbreak of war in Europe. The Empire of Japan and Nazi Germany had signed the Anti-Comintern Pact in 1936, to counter the perceived threat of the communism of the Soviet Union. During negotiations with the administration of U.S. President Franklin D. Roosevelt, British Prime Minister Winston Churchill had promised to declare war "within the hour" of a Japanese attack on the United States. 

On 7/8 December 1941, Japan attacked British and American territories in Southeast Asia and the Central Pacific with near-simultaneous offensives including an attack on the US fleet at Pearl Harbor.

Decision and communication 
News of the attack on Pearl Harbor reached London first. Realizing that President Roosevelt would go through the formal process of asking the United States Congress for a declaration of war, Churchill began making preparations to deliver the UK's own declaration of war immediately after Congress had formally declared war. After learning British territory had also been attacked, the British Prime Minister decided there was no need to wait for Congress to act and promptly summoned the Japanese Ambassador to Britain.

The British Secretary of State for Foreign Affairs, Anthony Eden, was in transit to Moscow at the time, so Churchill was in charge of the Foreign Office. Churchill instructed the British Ambassador to Japan to inform the Japanese government that a state of war exists between the two countries and drafted a letter to the Ambassador of Japan to the United Kingdom to inform him of this. Of the letter, Churchill later wrote: "Some people did not like this ceremonial style. But after all when you have to kill a man it costs nothing to be polite."

The United Kingdom declared war on Japan nine hours before the U.S. The earlier declaration by the UK was due to the Japanese attacks on the British colonies of Malaya, Singapore, and Hong Kong, and also due to the fact that the British did not have the American constitutional tradition of requiring the consent of its own national legislature to declare war - the British cabinet could declare war without consulting Parliament, and therefore could act more quickly.

Text of Churchill's letter 
The text of his letter to the Japanese Ambassador was as follows:

See also
Arcadia Conference
Declaration of war
Declarations of war by Great Britain and the United Kingdom
 Declarations of war during World War II
 Diplomatic history of World War II
Japanese declaration of war on the United States and the British Empire
United Kingdom declaration of war on Germany (1939)
United States declaration of war on Japan

References

Sources
 Churchill, Winston S., The Second World War (vol. 3): The Grand Alliance'' (1950) .
 .

Military history of Japan during World War II
United Kingdom in World War II
1941 in the United Kingdom
1941 in Japan
Japan–United Kingdom military relations
Declarations of war during World War II
1941 in international relations
1941 in military history
British Empire in World War II
December 1941 events
1941 documents